A nut is a type of fastener with a threaded hole. Nuts are almost always used in conjunction with a mating bolt to fasten multiple parts together. The two partners are kept together by a combination of their threads' friction (with slight elastic deformation), a slight stretching of the bolt, and compression of the parts to be held together.

In applications where vibration or rotation may work a nut loose, various locking mechanisms may be employed: lock washers, jam nuts, eccentric double nuts, specialist adhesive thread-locking fluid such as Loctite, safety pins (split pins) or lockwire in conjunction with castellated nuts, nylon inserts (nyloc nut), or slightly oval-shaped threads.

Square nuts, as well as bolt heads, were the first shape made and used to be the most common largely because they were much easier to manufacture, especially by hand. While rare today due to the reasons stated below for the preference of hexagonal nuts, they are occasionally used in some situations when a maximum amount of torque and grip is needed for a given size: the greater length of each side allows a spanner to be applied with a larger surface area and more leverage at the nut.

The most common shape today is hexagonal, for similar reasons as the bolt head: six sides give a good granularity of angles for a tool to approach from (good in tight spots), but more (and smaller) corners would be vulnerable to being rounded off. It takes only one sixth of a rotation to obtain the next side of the hexagon and grip is optimal. However, polygons with more than six sides do not give the requisite grip and polygons with fewer than six sides take more time to be given a complete rotation. Other specialized shapes exist for certain needs, such as wingnuts for finger adjustment and captive nuts (e.g. cage nuts) for inaccessible areas.

Types
A wide variety of nuts exists, from household hardware versions to specialized industry-specific designs that are engineered to meet various technical standards. Fasteners used in automotive, engineering, and industrial applications usually need to be tightened to a specific torque setting, using a torque wrench. Nuts are graded with strength ratings compatible with their respective bolts; for example, an ISO property class 10 nut will be able to support the bolt proof strength load of an ISO property class 10.9 bolt without stripping. Likewise, an SAE class 5 nut can support the proof load of an SAE class 5 bolt, and so on.

Locknuts

Many specialised types of nut exist to resist loosening of bolted joints, either by providing a prevailing torque against the male fastener or by gripping against the bolted components.  These are generally referred to as locknuts.

 Castellated nut
 Distorted thread locknut
 Centerlock nut
 Elliptical offset locknut
 Toplock nut
 Interfering thread nut
Tapered thread nut
 Jam nut
 Jet nut (K-nut)
 Keps nut (K-nut or washer nut) with a star-type lock washer
 Nyloc plate nut
 Polymer insert nut (Nyloc)
 Security locknut
 Serrated face nut
 Serrated flange nut
 Speed nut (Sheet metal nut or Tinnerman nut)
 Split beam nut
 BINX nut

Gallery

Standard nut sizes

Metric hex nuts 

Note that flat (spanner or wrench) sizes differ between industry standards.  For example, spanner or wrench sizes of fastener used in Japanese built cars comply with JIS automotive standard.

SAE hex nuts

Classifications

Manufacture

See also 

 Bolted joint
 Mechanical joint
 Pipe cap
 Tap
 Tapped hole
 Threaded insert
 Washer

References

Bibliography

 .
 

Threaded fasteners